The New Caledonia national beach soccer team represents New Caledonia in international beach soccer competitions and is controlled by the New Caledonian Football Federation, the governing body for football in New Caledonia.

Achievements
OFC Beach Soccer Championship Best: Runners-up
2013

Current squad
The following players were called to the squad for the 2019 OFC Beach Soccer Nations Cup from 17–23 June 2019.Caps and goals updated as of 24 June 2019 after the game against Vanuatu.

Current squad
Correct as of August 2013.

Coach: Felix Tagawa

References

Oceanian national beach soccer teams
Beach Soccer